The FAI World Grand Prix 2010–2011 was the fourth gliding Grand Prix. The 9 qualifying races took place during 2010–2011 worldwide flying season. The qualifying rounds were held all over the world. The Finals were held in Wasserkuppe, Germany from the 23rd to the 30th of July.

Due to scheduling conflicts with the European Gliding Championships held in Nitra, Slovakia, from 17 to 30 July 2011, some pilots couldn't attend the Grand Prix Final. Among others, triple and defending Grand Prix World champion Sebastian Kawa did not attend The Finals, instead he went on to win the European Gliding Championships in the Standard class.

Summary

Overall results

* – competition number

Qualifying races

See also
Results of Grand Prix series
World Gliding Championships
European Gliding Championships

External links 
 https://web.archive.org/web/20100529223816/http://www.fai.org/gliding/QSGP2010_2011
 https://web.archive.org/web/20110417152942/http://www.qsgp2011.fi/  Finland 2011

Gliding competitions
2010 in German sport
2011 in German sport
Gliding in Germany
2010 in air sports
2011 in air sports
Aviation history of Germany